Trip is the second studio album by Filipino rock band Rivermaya. It has 13 tracks and was released under BMG Records (Pilipinas) Inc. in 1996. It is the first album to introduce Rico Blanco as the band's full-time guitarist. after the departure of Perf de Castro the year previous. Since the album release, the album went gold overnight and reached platinum status in six days and the carrier single "Kisapmata" becomes the most requested tune in Top Rating FM Stations. On June 30, 1996 the band launched their first Music Video on their next single "Himala" at the TV show ASAP.

Track listing 
All tracks written by Rico Blanco, except where noted.

Trivia 
The album art was illustrated by well-known X-Men comic-book artist and Image Comics co-founder Whilce Portacio.
The single "Panahon na Naman" were included in the compilation album "1896: Ang Pagsilang". The album commemorates the historical 1896 uprising of Filipinos against the Spanish colonizers.
Former member Bamboo Mañalac stated the song "Flowers" is his favorite Rivermaya song.
In 2000, Comedian Michael V covered the song Kisapmata in English Version "Twinkle of an Eye". The track was included in his album "MEB: Miyusik English Bersyon".
In 2007, The song "Kisapmata" was covered by Yasmien Kurdi and was used as a carrier single for her 2nd album Love Is All I Need. The song was also covered by  YouTube sensation Raphiel Shannon and release as a debut single. A few days after its online release, her song grabbed the No. 4 spot on Spotify’s Philippines Viral 50 chart last March 30, 2018.
The song Himala was covered by Kitchie Nadal as a theme song for the 2008 ABS CBN TV drama series Humingi Ako Sa Langit starring Judy Ann Santos.

Personnel 
Francisco "Bamboo" Mañalac – lead vocals, backing vocals (track 13)
Rico Blanco – guitars, keyboards, backing vocals, lead vocals (tracks 9, 12, 13)
Nathan Azarcon – bass, guitars (tracks 2, 4, 6, 7), backing vocals
Mark Escueta – drums & percussion, backing vocals

Additional musician:

 Francisco Llorin – cello (track 13)

Album credits 
Produced by: Rico Blanco 
Supervising Producers: Chito Roño & Lizza G. Nakpil
Executive Producers: Rudy Y. Tee
A & R: Vic Valenciano
Sound Engineer: Slick
Album Mix: Slick with Rico Blanco and Nathan Azarcon
Package Art: Whilce Portacio
Package Direction: Rico Blanco

Accolades

References

1996 albums
Bertelsmann Music Group albums
Rivermaya albums